The Three Hours' Agony (also known as the Tre Ore, The Great Three Hours, or Three Hours' Devotion) is a Christian service held in many Roman Catholic, Lutheran, Anglican and Methodist churches on Good Friday from noon till 3p.m. to commemorate the three hours of Christ's hanging at the cross.

It includes sermons on the Seven Last Words from the Cross, and usually occurs between noon and 3p.m. (the latter being the time Jesus is said to have died on the cross and the time the Liturgy of the Lord's Passion begins), and sometimes between 6p.m. and 9p.m.

The Jesuit priest Alphonsus Messia (died 1732) is said to have devised this devotion in Lima, Peru. It was introduced to Rome around 1788 and spread around the world to many Christian denominations. In 1815, Pope Pius VII decreed a plenary indulgence to those who practise this devotion on Good Friday.

References

External links
Good Friday Tre Ore Worship Service: The Seven Last Words of Jesus from the Cross, given at St. John's Lutheran Church, Missouri
The three hours' agony of Our Lord Jesus Christ: given at the Roman Catholic Church of Our Lady of Lourdes, New York, Good Friday
English text: "The devotion of the three hours' agony on Good Friday"
Spanish text: Devoción a las tres horas de la agonía de Cristo nuestro Redentor..., 1782
 Italian text: Divozione alle tre ore dell'agonia di Gesù Cristo nostro redentore...

Holy Week
Crucifixion of Jesus
Catholic liturgy
Lutheran liturgy and worship
Methodist texts
Anglican liturgy